The MV Maassluis was a tanker owned by the Dutch shipping-company Nedlloyd. On 15 February 1989 the ship was lost in heavy weather near the port of Skikda in Algeria.
Two sailors, who were swept overboard when they tried to work on the anchor, survived this accident. The other 27 crew lost their lives.

For his brave actions in trying to rescue the ship and her crew first officer Peter Korsen was posthumously promoted to captain.

Events
The ship was empty and with a minimum amount of ballast lie for anchor for the port of Skikda when very bad weather and high winds were expected. When the wind reached force 10 on the Beaufort scale the ship pulled loose from her anchors and smashed against the piers of the harbour.

The captain and first officer had tried to start the engines to sail clear from the nearby pier-heads, but it was too late. The disaster with this Dutch ship was the single most serious shipping disaster for a ship under Dutch flag since the second World-War.

Cause
As the Maassluis was expected to enter the port of Skikda the next day to load the captain dropped her anchor very close to the head of the pier of the port. Also because she would enter the port the next morning to load up the ship was empty and her ballast-tanks were also (nearly) empty. During the evening a fierce storm broke out and waves reached a height of 9 to 12 meters. The wind reached a force of 10 Beaufort and was directed inland.

Around 23:00 hours the captain, with help from the 1st officer, started the engines and tried to sail free from the pierhead using full power. Two Indonesian sailors were sent forward to raise the anchor so the ship would be able to sail away from the shore.
These two sailors were swept overboard by the wind and waves but managed to reach the shore with minor wounds. These two sailors were the only survivors of the disaster.

Despite using full engine-power the Maassluis wasn't able to move free from the piers and around 23:30 the ship comes in contact with the piers and breaks up.

Of the 27 people that lost their live the remains of only four were discovered and preserved: of the 23 other crew no remains were ever found.

Sources

Maritime incidents in 1989
Oil tankers
1982 ships